Jaime A. Areizaga-Soto is an American attorney and politician who has served as the chairman of the Board of Veterans' Appeals in the United States Department of Veterans Affairs since September 2022.

In 2011, he was the Democratic nominee for a seat in the Senate of Virginia.

Early life and education
Areizaga-Soto was born in Moca and raised in San Juan, Puerto Rico. The youngest of four siblings, his father worked for the Puerto Rico Department of Economic Development and his mother was an elementary school teacher. He earned a Bachelor of Science degree in foreign service from Georgetown University, followed by a joint Master of Arts in Latin American studies from Stanford University and Juris Doctor from Stanford Law School in 1994. General Areizaga-Soto graduated from the United States Army Command and General Staff College in Fort Leavenworth and has a master's in Security and Defense from the Inter-American Defense College in Fort Lesley J. McNair. Among his military awards are the Legion of Merit and the Meritorious Service Medal with one bronze Oak leaf cluster.

Career 
Areizaga-Soto began his career as an associate at Paul, Weiss, Rifkind, Wharton & Garrison. From 1996 to 1999, he was an associate at Hogan & Hartson. From 1999 to 2007, he was a member of the global project finance group at Clifford Chance. Areizaga-Soto later served as a White House fellow and attorney for the United States Agency for International Development in 2010 and 2011.

From 1997 to 2013, Areizaga-Soto served in the District of Columbia Army National Guard, retiring as a lieutenant colonel in the Judge Advocate General's Corps. From 2011 to 2013, Areizaga-Soto managed Latino outreach for the Democratic Party of Virginia. He also served as an advisor to State Senator Mary Margaret Whipple. In 2012 and 2013, he was deputy director of the Democratic National Committee for Hispanic affairs. He was also president of the Hispanic Bar Association of the District of Columbia in 2013 and 2014. From 2015 to 2018, he served as a commander in the National Guard Bureau. In 2016 and 2017, he was vice president of the Hispanic National Bar Association for membership. Areizaga-Soto also served as deputy Virginia secretary of veterans affairs.

On April 25, 2022, President Joe Biden nominated Areizaga-Soto to serve as the Chairman of the Board of Veterans Appeals, replacing Cheryl Mason. Areizaga-Soto was confirmed by the United States Senate on August 4, 2022, and he was sworn in on September 15, 2022.

References 

Living people
United States Department of Veterans Affairs officials
District of Columbia National Guard personnel
Walsh School of Foreign Service alumni
Recipients of the Legion of Merit
Recipients of the Meritorious Service Medal (United States)
People from Moca, Puerto Rico
People from San Juan, Puerto Rico
Virginia Democrats
Stanford University alumni
Stanford Law School alumni
United States Army Command and General Staff College alumni
Virginia lawyers
21st-century Puerto Rican lawyers
1969 births
Biden administration personnel